"All We Ever Knew" is a song written and recorded by American folk band the Head and the Heart, released as the lead single for their third studio album Signs of Light by Warner Bros. Records. The song was written by the band and produced by Jay Joyce.

Commercial performance 
"All We Ever Knew" spent eight weeks at number one on Billboard's Adult Alternative Songs chart, and became their first song to chart on the Alternative Songs chart. The song is also their highest peaking song on the Hot Rock Songs chart.

Charts

Weekly charts

Year-end charts

Certifications

References 

2016 singles
2016 songs
Music videos directed by Marc Klasfeld
Warner Records singles